The 2016 Campeonato Nacional de Velocidade Turismos is the second season of the TCR Portuguese Series. Starting from this season, the championship will run separate from the GT Class of the championship (that will form che Endurance Class) organised by FullEventos. As for the Italian series, TCR cars will be placed side by side with TCS, also with the addition of a trophy cars category (TCC class).

Teams and drivers
Hankook is the official tyre supplier.

Calendar and results
The 2016 schedule was announced on 3 December 2015, with one out of five events scheduled to be held in Spain. A reserve round was scheduled at Autódromo do Estoril for 27 November. The race format is divided into Sprint and Double Sprint: the first one contemplates two 25-minute-long races, the second one is formed by four 20-minute-long races. By early April, the Estoril round was moved from 17–18 September to the reserve date.

Championship standings

Drivers' Championship

† – Drivers did not finish the race, but were classified as they completed over 75% of the race distance.

References

External links
 
 

Portugal
CNV